Fiona M. Scott Morton is an American economist who serves as the Theodore Nierenberg Professor at Yale School of Management. Her research in industrial organization has covered industries including magazines, shipping, pharmaceuticals, and internet retail. She served as associate dean of the Yale School of Management from 2007 to 2010, and she has won the school's teaching award twice.

From 2011 to 2012, she served as the Deputy Assistant Attorney General for Economics at the United States Department of Justice Antitrust Division. In her academic work, she has advocated for the U.S. government's role in ensuring healthy competition in healthcare markets and the tech industry.

Life and education
Scott Morton grew up in Lexington, Massachusetts, where she attended the public schools. She graduated from Yale in 1989 with a Bachelor of Arts magna cum laude in economics. She then did doctoral study in economics at MIT, receiving a Ph.D. in 1994.

References

External links

Year of birth missing (living people)
Living people
Yale School of Management faculty
20th-century American economists
21st-century American economists
American women economists
Massachusetts Institute of Technology alumni
Yale University alumni
20th-century American women
21st-century American women